The 2003 Florida Atlantic University Owls football team represented Florida Atlantic University in the 2003 NCAA Division I-AA football season. The team was coached by Howard Schnellenberger and played their home games at Lockhart Stadium in Fort Lauderdale, Florida.  The Owls competed in them as an independent.

Schedule

Awards and honors

Mid-season awards and honors
 Week 4 Independent Player of the Week: Roosevelt Bynes (WR, Jr.)
 Week 8 Independent Player of the Week: Willie Hughley (CB, So.)

All-Independent honors
 First Team All-Independent:
 Jared Allen (QB, Jr.)
 Roosevelt Bynes (WR, Jr.)
 Anthony Crissinger-Hill (WR, Jr.)
 Quentin Swain (LB, Sr.)
 Second Team All-Independent:
 Anthony Jackson (RB, Jr.)
 Ken Campos (OL, Sr.)
 George Guffey (OL, Sr.)
 Dave Richards (OL, Sr.)
 Chris Laskowski (LB, Jr.)
 Willie Hughley (CB, So.)

All-South Region honors
 First Team All-South Region:
 Roosevelt Bynes (WR, Jr.)
 Anthony Crissinger-Hill (WR, Jr.)
 Willie Hughley (CB, So.)
 Second Team All-South Region:
 Jared Allen (QB, Jr.)
 George Guffey (OL, Sr.)
 Dave Richards (OL, Sr.)
 Chris Laskowski (LB, Jr.)
 Third Team All-South Region:
 Yrvens Guerrier (DL, Sr.)
 Mike Myers (K, Jr.)

References

Florida Atlantic
Florida Atlantic Owls football seasons
Florida Atlantic Owls football